Events in the year 2018 in Brazil.

Incumbents

Federal government 
 President: Michel Temer 
 Vice President: vacant

Governors
 Acre: Tião Viana
 Alagoas: Renan Filho
 Amapa: Waldez Góes
 Amazonas: Amazonino Mendes
 Bahia: Rui Costa
 Ceará: Camilo Santana
 Espírito Santo: Paulo Hartung
 Goiás: José Eliton Júnior
 Maranhão: Flávio Dino
 Mato Grosso: Pedro Taques
 Mato Grosso do Sul: Reinaldo Azambuja
 Minas Gerais: Fernando Damata Pimentel
 Pará: Simão Jatene
 Paraíba: Ricardo Coutinho
 Paraná: Carlos Alberto "Beto" Richa then Cida Borghetti
 Pernambuco: Paulo Câmara
 Piauí: Wellington Dias
 Rio de Janeiro: 
 Rio Grande do Norte: Robinson Faria
 Rio Grande do Sul: José Ivo Sartori
 Rondônia: Confúcio Moura (until 6 April),  (6 April-31 December)
 Roraima: Suely Campos
 Santa Catarina: Raimundo Colombo (until 16 February), Eduardo Moreira (starting 16 February)
 São Paulo: Geraldo Alckmin (until 6 April), Márcio França (starting 6 April)
 Sergipe: Jackson Barreto
 Tocantins: Marcelo Miranda

Vice governors
 Acre: Maria Nazareth Melo de Araújo Lambert
 Alagoas: José Luciano Barbosa da Silva
 Amapá: João Bosco Papaléo Paes
 Amazonas: João Bosco Gomes Saraiva
 Bahia: João Leão
 Ceará: Maria Izolda Cela de Arruda Coelho
 Espírito Santo: César Roberto Colnago
 Goiás: José Eliton de Figueiredo Júnior
 Maranhão: Carlos Orleans Brandão Júnior
 Mato Grosso: Carlos Henrique Baqueta Fávaro (until 5 April), vacant thereafter
 Mato Grosso do Sul: Rose Modesto
 Minas Gerais: Antônio Eustáquio Andrade Ferreira
 Pará: José da Cruz Marinho 
 Paraíba: Lígia Feliciano
 Paraná: Maria Aparecida Borghetti (until 6 April), vacant thereafter
 Pernambuco: Raul Jean Louis Henry Júnior
 Piaui: Margarete de Castro Coelho
 Rio de Janeiro: Francisco Dornelles
 Rio Grande do Norte: Fábio Dantas
 Rio Grande do Sul: José Paulo Dornelles Cairoli
 Rondônia: Daniel Pereira
 Roraima: Paulo César Justo Quartiero
 Santa Catarina: Eduardo Pinho Moreira
 São Paulo: Márcio França
 Sergipe: Belivaldo Chagas Silva
 Tocantins: Cláudia Telles de Menezes Pires Martins Lelis (until 27 March), Wanderlei Barbosa Castro (starting 9 July)

Events

January
 January 1 – An apparent gang riot at Colônia Agroindustrial prison in Goiânia results in nine deaths and 14 inmates injured.  Authorities report 233 prisoners escaped; 29  were recaptured, and 109 prisoners returned voluntarily.
 January 3 – Petrobras announced it would pay $2.95 billion to settle a shareholder lawsuit in the United States stemming from the bribes and kickbacks in the Operation Car Wash scandal. The company said in a filing with the US Securities and Exchange Commission (SEC) that it had been a victim of dishonesty but that it had decided that it was in its best interest to settle and minimize uncertainty and risk.
 January 18
An appeals court upheld the corruption conviction of Luiz Inácio Lula da Silva, by far the frontrunner in the upcoming presidential election. It also increased his sentence to twelve years. Lula's lawyers planned to appeal and Lula expressed intentions of campaigning for office until physically prevented from doing so.
The public prosecutor in São Paulo filed a civil suit against BNY Mellon alleging mishandling of postal worker retirement funds for Postalis.
 January 19 – Fifteen people are injured and an infant killed after a car hit a group of pedestrians near Copacabana Beach in Rio de Janeiro. The police report the driver had an epileptic seizure.
January 25 – The Workers' Party (PT) insisted that former president Luiz Inácio Lula da Silva would be their candidate for the upcoming presidential election even as a conviction for corruption bars him from participating.

February
 February 1 - Postalis had lost billion reais ($1.9 billion) to embezzlement, police announced.
 February 5 - Saying that the Fundação Nacional do Índio (Funai) and Chico Mendes Institute for Biodiversity Conservation  had failed to take action against illegal mining in the Munduruku Indigenous Territory, indigenous leaders said they would take matters into their own hands. The group had previously taken over the Belo Monte Dam in 2013.
 February 7 – Petrobras, Brazil's state-owned oil company, announced plans to sell an oil refinery in Pasadena, Texas whose purchase featured prominently in the Operation Car Wash investigation
 February 10 - Police said they had found no evidence to support the charge that Michel Temer caused a benefit to Rodrimar SA, who operate the Port of Santos, Latin America's busiest port, and that a video made by cooperating witness  of a conversation on the subject with Temer's legal advisor essentially showed a refusal.
 February 11 - Temer pledged assistance to the northern state of Roraima with a massive influx of refugees from Venezuela. State capital Boa Vista reported 40,000 displaced Venezuelans in the city of 400,000, many living in the streets.
 February 12 - BNDES announced that it had extended a $2 billion line of credit to Angola for economic development.
 February 14 - Kinross Gold Corporation acquired two hydroelectric power plants in Brazil and reported a profit for 4th quarter 2017.
 February 28 - Reports show that North Korean leader Kim Jong-un and his father Kim Jong-il used fraudulently-obtained Brazilian passports in order to apply for visas to visit Western countries in the 1990s.

March
 March 14 – Brazilian politician and outspoken police critic Marielle Franco is killed along with her driver in a drive-by shooting in Rio de Janeiro.

April
 April 5 – Federal judge Sérgio Moro orders the arrest of former President Luiz Inácio Lula da Silva by late Friday to begin serving a 12-year sentence for corruption.
 April 7 – Former President Luiz Inácio Lula da Silva gives a public address alongside his impeached successor Dilma Rousseff in Sao Bernardo do Campo, saying he will comply with an arrest warrant and begin a 12-year term for corruption after two failed appeals to have the warrant withdrawn. He maintains his innocence.
 April 8 – Former President of Brazil Luiz Inácio Lula da Silva surrenders to police following a two-day stand-off at a steelworkers' union building in São Bernardo do Campo.
 April 27 – FIFA hands a lifetime ban to Marco Polo Del Nero, President of the Brazilian Football Confederation, for taking bribes. He is also fined one million francs.

May 
 May 1 – Edifício Wilton Paes de Almeida, a 26-story tower block in São Paulo, Brazil, is destroyed by a fire and consequent collapse. Neighbouring buildings are also damaged by fire. Authorities warn the casualty toll is "likely to be high".

August 
 August 31 – The Superior Electoral Court of Brazil rules that former President and Workers' Party (PT) presidential candidate Luiz Inácio Lula da Silva cannot run in the election because he does not qualify under the Clean Slate law. The Court also ruled that PT cannot run political ads featuring Lula.

September 
 September 2 – A massive fire destroys most of the Paço de São Cristóvão, which houses the National Museum of Brazil, in Rio de Janeiro. The museum holds important archaeological and anthropological objects, including the remains of the Luzia Woman, Marajoara vases and Egyptian mummies.
 September 6 – Presidential candidate Jair Bolsonaro is stabbed on 6 September 2018 while campaigning in the city of Juiz de Fora, Minas Gerais and interacting with supporters.

October 
 October 7  – First round of general election.
 October 28 – Second round of general election.
 Brazilians elect Jair Bolsonaro of the Social Liberal Party as president, with 55% of the vote, in the second round of the presidential election.

November 
 November 2 – The president-elect of Brazil, Jair Bolsonaro, states that he will honor his campaign pledge to move the country's embassy in Israel from Tel Aviv to Jerusalem.
 November 10 – A landslide leaves at least 10 people dead while eleven others are injured in Niterói.

December 
 December 7 – Eleven people die, including five hostages, as armed police battle robbers who had tried to raid two banks in Milagres.
 December 11 – A gunman kills four people and injures four others at a Catholic cathedral in Campinas. The gunman shot himself after the attack.

Arts and culture 
2017–18 Brazil network television schedule
List of Brazilian films of 2018

Sports 
2018 in Brazilian football

Deaths
Uploaded media
 January 1 – Humberto Coutinho, 71, politician and doctor, bowel cancer.
 January 2 – Armando Monteiro Filho, 92, politician, Minister of Agriculture (1961–1962).
 January 3 – Darci Miguel Monteiro, 49, footballer (Volta Redonda Futebol Clube, Widzew Łódź, Antalyaspor), heart attack.
January 5 – Carlos Heitor Cony, 91, journalist and writer, multiple organ failure.
January 6 – Remídio José Bohn, 67, Roman Catholic prelate, Bishop of Cachoeira do Sul (since 2011).
January 19 – Célio de Oliveira Goulart, 73, Roman Catholic prelate, Bishop of São João del Rei (since 2010).
January 28 – Antônio Agostinho Marochi, 92, Roman Catholic prelate, Bishop of Presidente Prudente (1976–2002).
February 2 – Fábio Pereira de Azevedo, 41, Brazilian-born Togolese footballer (A.D. Isidro Metapán), traffic collision.
February 2 – Paulo Roberto Morais Júnior, 33, footballer (Incheon United, Al-Fujairah), leukemia.
February 3 – Oswaldo Loureiro, 85, actor.
February 8 – Agenor Girardi, 66, Roman Catholic prelate, Bishop of União da Vitória (since 2015).
February 9 – Robert W. Lichtwardt, 93, Brazilian-born American mycologist.
February 13 – Danilo Caçador, 32, footballer (Chapecoense, Juazeirense), heart attack.
February 18 – Theotônio dos Santos, 81, economist.
February 26 – João W. Nery, 68, writer and LGBT activist 
March 3 – Tônia Carrero, 95, actress (Água Viva, Louco Amor), complications from surgery.
March 7 – Victor Heringer, 29, novelist, translator (First They Killed My Father) and poet, Prêmio Jabuti laureate (2013), suicide by jumping.
March 13 – Bebeto de Freitas, 68, Olympic volleyball coach (1984) and football manager (Clube Atlético Mineiro), World Championship (1998), heart attack.
March 14 – Marielle Franco, 38, politician, shot.
March 22 – Carlos Eduardo Miranda, 56, musician, record producer and reality television judge (Ídolos, Qual é o Seu Talento?, Esse Artista Sou Eu).
May 4 – Alexandre Wollner, 89, graphic design pioneer, stroke.
May 24 – Adelaide Neri, 77, teacher and politician.
July 3 – Guilherme Uchoa, 71, politician, President of the Legislative Assembly of Pernambuco, pulmonary edema.

See also
Brazilian general election, 2018
Operation Car Wash
Petrobras
Deforestation in Brazil
2017 in Brazil
2016 in Brazil

References

 
2010s in Brazil
Brazil
Brazil
Years of the 21st century in Brazil